The Tower Osaka is a high rise apartment building situated at Hotarumachi, 1-1 Fukushima, Fukushima-ku, Osaka, Japan. It is the highest building in Fukushima ward.

Access 

See also 
Osaka
Hotarumachi
Nakanoshima
List of tallest buildings in Osaka

Fukushima-ku, Osaka
Skyscrapers in Osaka
Residential skyscrapers in Japan
Mitsubishi Estate